Giovanni Battista Maganza (c. 1513 – August 25, 1586) was a late Renaissance Italian painter and poet, from Vicenza in the area of Calaone, mainly producing religious altarpieces for local churches.

Biography

Maganza was also a poet and a friend of Andrea Palladio.  He visited Rome between 1546 and 1547 and also met Gian Giorgio Trissino and the poet Marco Thiene, he was member of the Accademia Olimpica (Olympic Academy) in Venice where he designed costumes for the play Oedipus Rex, the first opera presented at the Palladio-designed Teatro Olimpico.

As a poet, he wrote satires in the Paduan dialect (and precisely in a now-dead form of it, called "dialetto pavano"), under the nickname Magagnò.

His son Alessandro Maganza was also a prominent local painter. Fontana cites Lanzi and Zanetti as Maganza's dates of birth and death as 1509 and 1589 Giovanni De Mio was one of his pupils.

Works
Partial listing:

San Girolamo penitente (Saint Jerome Penitent) (1570), San Marco in San Girolamo church, Vicenza
 Pala del Rosario (1583), Montebello Vicentino church.
 La conversione di S.Paolo (Conversion of Saint Paul) (16th century), at the large altar of the Novale di Valdagno church, Vicenza.
 Frescoes in Villa Repeta and Campiglia dei Berici.

See also 
San Marco in San Girolamo

References

Bibliography

 

1510s births
1586 deaths
16th-century Italian painters
Italian male painters
Painters from Vicenza
People from Vicenza
Italian poets
Italian male poets